Zazhigino is a rural locality (a village) in Kargopolskoye Rural Settlement of Kargopolsky District, Arkhangelsk Oblast, Russia. The population was 7 as of 2010. There is 1 street.

Geography 
Zazhigino is located 2 km north of Kargopol (the district's administrative centre) by road . Kargopol is the nearest rural locality.

References 

Rural localities in Kargopolsky District